Maharaj Kumari Binodini Devi  (6 February 1922 - 17 January 2011) was an Indian novelist, short story writer, playwright, lyricist and member of the royal family of Manipur. She published books under the name Binodini. She was best known for her 1976 novel Boro Saheb Ongbi Sanatombi.

In 2014, she was conferred with the Best Story award at the 9th Manipur State Film Awards for the movie Nangna Kappa Pakchade. The award was given posthumously.

Life
She was born to Sir Maharaj Churachand Singh, the king of Manipur and Maharani Dhanamanjuri on 6 February 1922  and was known by the name Wangolsana or Sana Wangol in the royal palace. She was the first woman graduate of Manipur. Binodini married Dr. Laifungbam Nandalal Roy with whom she had two sons.

Her life as a writer
She began writing at age 17 with a short story titled Imaton. Her first book was Nunggairakta Chandramukhi, a collection of 16 short stories published in 1965, for which she received the Jamini Sundar Guha Gold Medal. She received a Sahitya Akademi Award in 1979 for her magnum opus Boro Saheb Ongbi Sanatombi. The novel is about her aunt Sanatombi and Manipur.

She wrote the play Ashangba Nongjabi (English: Crimson Rainclouds), and translated a play by Badal Sircar as Amasung Indrajit, which was later performed by artistes of the Manipur Dramatic Union (MDU), Imphal. She wrote lyrics for a song in the first Manipuri feature film Matamgi Manipur titled Lapna Lotna Leiyu. She also wrote scripts for Manipuri films like Olangthagee Wangmadasoo, Imagi Ningthem, Paokhum Ama, Ishanou, Sanabi, Mayophygee Macha, Thengmallabara Radha-Manbi and Nangna Kappa Pakchade. She also scripted Orchids of Manipur, Sangai: The Dancing Deer of Manipur, Rajarshri Bhagyachandra of Manipur and Laa, which are non-feature films. Her play Ashangba Nongjabi was later produced into a feature film. Her last novel Maharaj Churachandgi Imung was published in 2008.

Her short story Ngaihak Lambida was made into a non-feature film by Haobam Paban Kumar. In October 2001, she founded Leikol, a collective of women writers, bringing together women academicians, intellectuals and authors on a common platform where they can share various ideas and thoughts.

In popular culture
In 2002 and 2003, two non-feature films titled M.K. Binodini and Binodini: A Writer's Life respectively, documenting her life was made by Aribam Syam Sharma.

References

External links

1922 births
2011 deaths
20th-century Indian dramatists and playwrights
Indian women novelists
Indian women dramatists and playwrights
20th-century Indian women
20th-century Indian people
Recipients of the Sahitya Akademi Award in Meitei